Bell was launched in 1788 in Liverpool. Between 1788 and 1795 she made five voyages as a Liverpool-based slave ship in the triangular trade in enslaved people. The French captured her in 1796 on her sixth enslaving voyage after she had embarked her captives.

Career
1st enslaving voyage (1788–1790): Captain John Holliwell sailed from Liverpool on 30 November 1788, bound for West Africa. Bell started acquiring captives at Cape Grand Mount on 30 January 1789. She left Africa on 19 December 1789 and arrived at Dominica on 19 January 1790. At some point Thomas Oliver had replaced Holliwell as captain as Oliver was master when Bell arrived in Dominica. She had embarked 247 captives and arrived with 243, for a 2% mortality rate. The captives consisted of 134 men, 49 women, 30 girls, and 30 boys.

After the passage in 1788 of Dolben's Act, masters received a bonus of £100 for a mortality rate of under 2%; the ship's surgeon received £50. For a mortality rate between two and three percent, the bonus was halved. There was no bonus if mortality exceeded 3%.

Dolben's Act, the first British legislation to regulate the enslaving trade. The Act limited the number of enslaved people that British enslaving ships were permitted to transport without penalty, based on the ships' tons burthen.  At a burthen of 148 tons, the cap would have been 247 captives; at 220 tons, the cap would have been 380.

Bell left Dominica on 9 February and arrived back at Liverpool on 6 April. She had left Liverpool with 30 crew members and she had lost 12 on the voyage.

2nd enslaving voyage (1790–1791): Captain Oliver sailed from Liverpool on 21 May 1790. Bell acquired captives at Cape Grand Mount and arrived Dominica on 24 May. She had embarked 275 captives and she arrived with 246, for a mortality rate of 11%. The captives consisted of 147 men, 44 boys, 42 women, and 13 girls.

Bell sailed from Dominica on 8 June and arrived back at Liverpool on 24 July. She had left Liverpool with 26 crew members and suffered four crew deaths on her voyage. Between her arrival in Dominica and her arrival back in Liverpool, Bells master changed from Oliver to Gilbert Rigby.

3rd enslaving voyage (1791–1792): Captain Rigby sailed from Liverpool on 21 August 1791. Bell started acquiring captives on 20 October. She started at Cape Grand Mount, continued at Bassa, but gathered most of her captives at New Calabar. She sailed from Africa on 14 January 1792, stopping at Annobón on her way. She had embarked 452 captives and arrived at Dominica on 10 March with 234, for a mortality rate of 48%. The captives consisted of 104 men, 86 women, 27 girls, and 17 boys.

Bell sailed from Dominica on 9 April and arrived back at Liverpool on 16 May. She had left Liverpool with 19 crew members and had suffered one crew death on her voyage.

In his Memoirs, Crow wrote that Rigby had neither the firmness or the tact to command a crew, with the result that the crew became insubordinate.

4th enslaving voyage (1792–1793): Captain George Foreshaw may have been the master of record or the intended master before Bell sailed from Liverpool on 28 August 1792. However, Lloyd's List reported in February 1793 that Bell, Rigby, master, which had arrived in Africa, had spoken , Pratt, late master, off Madeira. Bell, Rigby, master, arrived at Montego Bay on 24 August 1793 with 257 captives. At some point Captain John Richards replaced Rigby. Bell left Jamaica on 10 October and arrived back at Liverpool on 30 December. She had left Liverpool with 25 crew members and had suffered ten crew deaths on her voyage.

5th enslaving voyage (1794–1795): Captain John Richards acquired a letter of marque on 1 August 1794. He sailed from Liverpool on 26 August. Bell started acquiring captives at Calabar on 28 October. She sailed from Africa on 30 December, and arrived at St Croix 19 February 1795. She had embarked 351 captives and arrived with 348, for a mortality rate of 1%. She sailed for Liverpool on 22 May and arrived there on 19 July. She had left Liverpool with 30 crew members and suffered three crew deaths on her voyage.

At the time Saint Croix was a Danish colony. In 1792, the Danish government passed a law that would outlaw Danish participation in the trans-Atlantic enslaving trade, from early 1803 on. This led the government in the Danish West Indies to encourage the importation of captives prior to the ban taking effect. One measure that it took was to open the trade to foreign vessels. Records for the period 1796 to 1799 show that 24 British enslaving ships, most of them from Liverpool, arrived at St Croix and imported a total of 6,781 captives.

6th enslaving voyage (1795–Loss): Captain David Thompson sailed from Liverpool on 24 November 1795. Bell acquired captives first at Îles de Los and then at Rio Pongo.

Loss
The French then gave Falmouth up to the crews.

Daedalus and Hornet destroyed Bell, and did some damage to the town and fort at Gorée.

In 1796, 22 British enslaving vessels were lost, five on the coast. In 1797, 40 were lost, 14 of them on the coast. In 1796, 103 vessels left British ports on enslaving voyages; for 1798 the number was 104. This puts the loss rates at 21% or 38%, respectively.

One estimate puts the Dolben's Act cap on Bell at 347 captives, though it is unknown how many were actually aboard at the time of capture. During the period 1793 to 1807, war, rather than maritime hazards or resistance by the captives, was the greatest cause of vessel losses among British enslaving vessels.

Notes

Citations

References
 
 
 
 
 
 
 

1788 ships
Liverpool slave ships
Captured ships